Osiris G. Matos Jimenez (born November 6, 1984 in Santo Domingo, Dominican Republic) is a former right-handed Major League Baseball relief pitcher.

Minor League Career 

 was an improvement for him and again with the AZL Giants, he went 2-0 with a 2.44 ERA in 11 games, eight of which he started. He also struck out 47 batters in 48 innings of work.

In , he pitched for the Augusta Greenjackets. In 29 games (22 of which he started), he did poorly, posting an 8-8 record with a 4.99 ERA. He struck out only 79 batters in 135 innings of work.

In , Matos split time between the Greenjackets and Connecticut Defenders, Matos did extremely well - especially with the Greenjackets. He was used entirely as a reliever, he appeared in 44 games for the Greenjackets, saving 13 games and striking out 81 batters in 61 innings of work. He posted a 1.77 ERA with them. He then went on to pitch in six games for the Defenders, posting a 3.72 ERA there, saving two more games. Overall, he had a 1.91 ERA in 2006, saving 15 games and striking out 86 batters in 70 innings of work.

In , he was again used entirely as a reliever and again he did very well. Like in 2006, he spent time with both the Greenjackets and Defenders, however he spent the majority of his time with the Defenders in 2007, as opposed to the previous year when he spent the majority of his time with the Greenjackets. Overall in 2007, he posted a 2.49 ERA with 52 strikeouts in 65 innings of work. He also saved eight games.

Overall, he has posted a 24-13 record with a 3.57 ERA so far in his minor league career. He has 24 career saves, 23 of which he has collected these past two years.

Major League Career 
On July 3, Matos made his major league debut against the Chicago Cubs. He pitched the ninth inning in a non-save situation, struck out one, and didn't allow a baserunner.

External links

1984 births
Arizona League Giants players
Augusta GreenJackets players
Azucareros del Este players
Connecticut Defenders players
Dominican Republic expatriate baseball players in Mexico
Dominican Republic expatriate baseball players in the United States
Fresno Grizzlies players
Indios de Mayagüez players
Dominican Republic expatriate baseball players in Puerto Rico

Living people
Major League Baseball pitchers
Major League Baseball players from the Dominican Republic
Mexican League baseball pitchers
Piratas de Campeche players
Richmond Flying Squirrels players
San Francisco Giants players
San Jose Giants players
Scottsdale Scorpions players
Sultanes de Monterrey players
Toros del Este players
Vaqueros Laguna players